The 1958 Temple Owls football team was an American football team that represented Temple University as a member of the Middle Atlantic Conference (MAC) during the 1958 NCAA College Division football season. In its third season under head coach Peter P. Stevens, the team compiled a 0–8 record. The season was part of a 21-game losing streak that began on November 2, 1957, and ended on September 24, 1960. The team played its home games at Temple Stadium in Philadelphia.

Schedule

References

Temple
Temple Owls football seasons
College football winless seasons
Temple Owls football